Thompsonville is an unincorporated community in Kent County, Delaware, United States. Thompsonville is located at the intersection of Milford Neck Road and Bennetts Pier Road, northeast of Milford.

References

Unincorporated communities in Kent County, Delaware
Unincorporated communities in Delaware